The Minister of State at the Department of Rural and Community Development is a junior ministerial post in the Department of Rural and Community Development of the Government of Ireland who performs duties and functions delegated by the Minister for Rural and Community Development. A Minister of State does not hold cabinet rank.

The current Minister of State is Joe O'Brien, TD, who was appointed in July 2020.

List of Ministers of State

References

Rural and Community Development
Department of Rural and Community Development